Edouard Robert (born June 24, 1937, in Midongy) is a Malagasy politician.  He is a member of the Senate of Madagascar for Analamanga, and is a member of the Tiako I Madagasikara party.

External links
Official page on the Senate website 

1937 births
Living people
Members of the Senate (Madagascar)
Tiako I Madagasikara politicians